A Girl, a Bottle, a Boat (stylized as a girl  a bottle  a boat) is the tenth studio album by American rock band Train, released on January 27, 2017, through Columbia Records. It is the band's first album without guitarist and founding member Jimmy Stafford (whose departure makes vocalist Pat Monahan the last original member to remain), as well as their last with drummer Drew Shoals.

Background
The first single "Play That Song" was released on September 29, 2016. To promote the lead single, they were featured at a Holiday Jam concert for New York City's local radio station WNEW-FM (also known as Fresh 102.7) at the Hammerstein Ballroom in Midtown Manhattan.

Promotion
The band promoted the album on the Play That Song Tour, which ran from May 12, 2017 to July 15, 2017 in the United States. The tour then continued overseas, beginning with Germany on October 12, 2017 and October 13, 2017, shortly followed by the United Kingdom from October 16, 2017 to October 23, 2017, along with the Netherlands and Ireland later in October 2017.

Critical reception

Since its release, A Girl, a Bottle, a Boat has received mixed reviews among critics. Stephen Thomas Erlewine of AllMusic gave the album a positive review, claiming that A Girl, a Bottle, a Boat is "an exuberant album, a celebration of everything that makes Train such a corny band. The hooks are big, the production is so glossy that it shines, and it's so cheerful it's bound to irritate anybody who isn't on the band's wavelength. If you're with them, though, a girl a bottle a boat is a good time because of its eagerness to please."

Commercial performance
The album debuted at No. 8 on the Billboard 200 albums chart on its first week of release, making it Train's sixth album to chart in the top 10. It sold 30,000 copies in the United States in its first week. It also debuted at No. 5 for Australian Albums (ARIA) and at No. 13 for UK Albums (OCC).

Track listing

Personnel
Credits adapted from AllMusic.

Train

Jerry Becker – keyboards, guitar
Hector Maldonado – bass guitar
Luis Maldonado – guitars
Pat Monahan – lead vocals
Drew Shoals – drums

Additional musicians
Ilsey Juber – vocals
William Wiik Larsen – bass guitar, guitar, keyboards, percussion 
Ron "Neff U" Feemstar – keyboards
Priscilla Renea – featured vocals on "Loverman"
Max Schneider – vocals
Suzy Shinn – vocals
Jake Sinclair – background vocals, bass guitar, keyboards, percussion

Production
Ajay Bhattacharyya – record producer
Taylor Carroll – engineer
Mike Endert – mixing
Celso Estrada – engineer
Ron "Neff U" Feemstar – additional production, producer
Ted Jensen – mastering
Doug Johnson – mixing assistant
William Larsen – producer, programming
Suzy Shinn – additional production, engineer 
Jake Sinclair – additional production, producer

Charts

References

2017 albums
Albums produced by Ajay Bhattacharya
Albums produced by Jake Sinclair (musician)
Albums produced by Theron Feemster
Columbia Records albums
Train (band) albums